Rainbow Springs is a large artesian spring in Florida, United States.

Rainbow Springs may also refer to:
 Rainbow Springs State Park, surrounding the springs
 Rainbow Springs, Florida, the community surrounding the springs and the park